Anthony Ryan (born 7 April 1980) is an Australian bobsledder who has competed since 2009. He finished 22nd in the two-man event at the 2010 Winter Olympics in Vancouver.

Ryan's best finish was second in a lesser event in the two-man event at Park City, Utah in November 2009.
He was formally a First grade Rugby player and National level sprinter

References
 

1980 births
Australian male bobsledders
Bobsledders at the 2010 Winter Olympics
Living people
Olympic bobsledders of Australia
Place of birth missing (living people)